The Boeing XP-7 was a prototype United States biplane fighter of the 1920s.

Development and design

The XP-7 started life as the last Boeing Model 15 (PW-9D), serial 28-41. It was then adapted to mount the 600 hp Curtiss V-1570 Conqueror engine. Labelled by Boeing as their Model 93, the XP-7's nose was shorter and deeper than that of the standard PW-9, and the craft was 75 pounds lighter overall.

It first flew in September 1928 and did well, with a 17 mph speed increase over the PW-9. However, despite a proposal to build an additional four P-7s, the design was at the very limits of its capabilities and somewhat outdated even by the time of its first flight. At the end of testing, the Conqueror engine was removed and the aircraft converted back into a PW-9D.

Operators

United States Army Air Corps

Specifications

References

Bibliography
 
 Lloyd S. Jones, U.S. Fighters (Aero Publishers, Inc., 1975) pp. 32–33 

Boeing P-07
P-07
Single-engined tractor aircraft
Biplanes